The 1969 FA Charity Shield was the 47th FA Charity Shield, an annual football match played between the winners of the previous season's Football League and FA Cup competitions. The match was contested by the league champions, Leeds United, and Manchester City, the cup winners. Leeds won the match 2–1, with goals from Eddie Gray and Jack Charlton. Colin Bell scored a consolation for City.

This match saw the début of Allan Clarke for Leeds United following his £165,000 transfer from Leicester City during the summer. Clarke was on the losing side to Manchester City in the previous season's FA Cup. Leeds took the lead after Giles' long ball into the box was headed across the six yard box for Gray to score. Leeds increased their lead three minutes later when Charlton headed in a free kick form Giles. Manchester City scored a late goal when Bell shot in following a goalkeeper error at a corner kick.

Match details

References

1969
Charity Shield 1969
Charity Shield 1969
Comm
Charity Shield